Gravity is the second studio album by the New Flamenco artist Jesse Cook.

Track listing
 "Mario Takes a Walk" (Cook) – 3:47
 "Azul" (Cook) – 4:16
 "Gravity" (Cook) – 3:57
 "Closer to Madness" (Cook) – 5:49
 "Into the Dark" (Cook) – 4:15
 "Brio" (Cook) – 3:15
 "Falling From Grace" (Cook) – 3:33
 "Olodum" (Cook) – 3:32
 "Rapture" (Cook) – 4:20
 "Gipsy" (Cook) – 2:29
 "Luna Llena" (Cook) – 5:21 (Includes hidden track "Hidden Gravity" at 6:00)

Credits
Jesse Cook – Guitars, keyboards, percussions
Tony Levin – Bass guitar
Blake Manning – Drums
Mario Melo – Percussion
Andrés Morales – Bass guitar

References

1996 albums
Jesse Cook albums
Narada Productions albums